Villa San Martín is a locality located in the south-central province of San Juan.

San Martín is an urban area that concentrates the main institutional and administrative buildings (municipality) of the San Martín Department; however, the rural way of life has an important significance, and its economy is primarily centered on the production of vines, primarily winemaking.

Geography

Population
In the 2010 census, Villa San Martín had a population of 1,899.

References

Populated places in San Juan Province, Argentina